Corozal South East is an electoral constituency in the Corozal District represented in the House of Representatives of the National Assembly of Belize since 2008 by Florencio Julian Marin of the People's United Party.

Profile

The Corozal South East constituency was one of 10 new seats created for the 1984 general election, created by a split of the previous Corozal South constituency. It is the largest constituency geographically in Corozal District, including the villages of Caledonia, Sarteneja and San Joaquin.

Corozal South East has been continuously held by the People's United Party (PUP) since its creation, first by former Leader of the Opposition Florencio Marin, then by his son Florencio Julian Marin. The elder Marin previously represented Corozal South.

It is considered a safe seat for the People’s United Party, as it has never been held by any party other than the PUP; nor had its predecessor constituency.

Area Representatives

Elections

References

Political divisions in Belize
Corozal South East
Belizean House constituencies established in 1984
Corozal District